Cow Creek is a tributary of the Sacramento River in Shasta County, California. The creek begins at Millville at the confluence of Old Cow and South Cow Creek and flows west to Junction, where it turns south, joining the Sacramento near Anderson. Despite its name, Cow Creek is closer in size to a river, especially in winter when it is prone to large flash floods, accounting for up to 21 percent of the Sacramento's peak flows at Red Bluff.

About 45 percent of the watershed is forested. Because the creek has no major dams, it is an important spawning area for Chinook salmon and steelhead trout; however, diversions for irrigation and pollution from farm runoff have reduced the quality of native fish habitat.

The  Old Cow Creek and  South Cow Creek originate in the Lassen National Forest, as does  Clover Creek, which joins Cow Creek a short distance below the confluence. The other major tributaries are  Oak Run and  Little Cow Creek, which drain a large area close to Shasta Lake.

See also
List of rivers of California

References

Rivers of Shasta County, California
Tributaries of the Sacramento River